Charadra may refer to:
Charadra (Epirus), a town of ancient Epirus
Charadra (Messenia), a town of ancient Messenia
Charadra (Phocis), a town of ancient Phocis
Charadra (moth), a genus of moth
Grewia, a genus of plants